Statistics of National Association Foot Ball League in season 1916-17.

League standings
                               GP   W   L   T   Pts
 Jersey A.C.               12   8   1   3   19
 Kearny Scots              12   7   3   2   16
 Bayonne Babcock & Wilcox  11   7   4   0   14
 New York F.C.             11   4   3   4   12
 West Hudson A.A.          12   1   6   5    7
 Dublin F.C. (Paterson)        10   2   7   1    5
 Newark Ironsides           9   1   6   2    4
 Brooklyn F.C.              1   0   1   0    0
 Splitdorf F.C.             0   0   0   0    0

References
NATIONAL ASSOCIATION FOOT BALL LEAGUE (RSSSF)

1916-17
1916–17 domestic association football leagues
1916–17 in American soccer